Schileykiella is a genus of gastropods belonging to the family Canariellidae.

The species of this genus are found in Italy.

Species:

Schileykiella bodoni 
Schileykiella mariarosariae 
Schileykiella parlatoris 
Schileykiella reinae

References

Canariellidae